Peligro may refer to:
 Peligro (Reik album), 2011
 "Peligro (Reik song)", a song from the album
 Peligro (Shakira album), 1993
 "Peligro (Shakira song)", a song from the album
 "Peligro de Extinción", a 2012 song by Ivy Queen
 "Peligro", a song by Mano Negra from the 1989 album Puta's Fever
 D. H. Peligro (1959–2022), drummer of the Dead Kennedys

See also
 El Peligro, a town in Buenos Aires Province, Argentina